Aron Sasu (born 5 March 2005) is a professional footballer who plays as a midfielder for  club AFC Wimbledon. Born in England, he has been called up to represent Norway at youth level.

Career
Sasu was called up to attend the training camps for the Norway under-16s team in January 2020. He made his debut for AFC Wimbledon on 26 October 2021, in a 2–0 defeat to Crystal Palace in the EFL Trophy.

Career statistics

References

2005 births
Living people
People from Croydon
English footballers
Norwegian footballers
English people of Norwegian descent
Association football midfielders
AFC Wimbledon players
English Football League players
Black British sportspeople